Manasu Maata Vinadhu is a 2005 Romantic Telugu film directed by V. N. Aditya. Navdeep pairs up with Ankitha.

Plot
Venu, a college student, falls in love with Anu. But it takes time lot of effort before he can get her to reciprocate his feelings. Before he can get her hand in marriage, there is a minor matter of dealing with another guy who likes Anu, Amit. The two guys have a hockey match to decide who should be with Anu. By the end of the story, true love triumphs!

Cast
 Navdeep as Venu
 Ankitha as Anu
 Sandeep as Amit
 Tanikella Bharani
 Dharmavarapu Subramanyam
 Venu Madhav
 Nagababu
 Sobha Rani
 Hema
 Venki
 Ahuti Prasad
 Narra Venkateswara Rao

Soundtrack

The Music was composed by Kalyan Koduri and Released by Aditya Music.

References

External links
 

2000s Telugu-language films
2005 films
Films directed by V. N. Aditya